Nanka Serkedzhieva (1925–2012) was a Bulgarian officer who was the second woman in Bulgaria to reach the rank of Major General in the Bulgarian military forces. During her military career, Nanka received a total of 9 awards, making her one of the most awarded female army officers in Bulgaria.

Life 
Nanka Dincheva Serkedzhieva was born 22 September 1925 in Plovdiv, Bulgaria. She attended high school in Plovdiv until 1943 when she was discharged after breaking school rules.

She joined the Bulgarian Communist Party in 1944.

In 1945, Serkedzhieva continued her education at Plovdiv University, but only briefly because she decided to drop out due to pregnancy.

In 1950 she joined the Ministry of internal affairs as an officer and also took part in the Central intelligence Agency of Bulgaria. The most prestigious among her medals and awards were "Red Flag" and "Red Star", along with "Hero of Socialist Labour".

Nanka Serkedzhieva passed away in Sofia on 5 December 2012.

Military awards 
 1953 – Fight Medal 
 1956 – "Red Flag" Communist award 
 1964 – Award "9th of September 1944" 1st degree
 1967 – Ministry of internal affairs medal 1st degree
 1969 – Public security & service medal
 1974 – Award 1st degree – Republic of Bulgaria
 1975 – Award 1st degree – Republic of Bulgaria
 1985 – Hero of Socialist Labour award
 1986 – Award 9 September 1944 1st degree

Military ranks 
 1947 – Militia Lieutenant
 1951 – State Security Major   
 1956 – State Security Lieutenant Colonel
 1975– State Security Major General

References 

  

1925 births
2012 deaths
Bulgarian military personnel of World War II
People from Plovdiv
Bulgarian women
Female military personnel
20th-century Bulgarian military personnel